New Shapes of Life is the third studio album by musician Martin Carr under his own name after releasing six solo albums under the name bravecaptain from 2000 to 2004.  It was released on 27 October 2017 through Tapete Records.

Track listing

References

2017 albums
Tapete Records albums